Genesis Rabbah (Hebrew: , B'reshith Rabba) is a religious text from Judaism's classical period, probably written between 300 and 500 CE with some later additions. It is a midrash comprising a collection of ancient rabbinical homiletical interpretations of the Book of Genesis (B'reshith in Hebrew).  
 
It is expository midrash to the first book of the Torah, assigned by tradition to the amora Hoshaiah (or Osha'yah), who flourished in the third century in Roman Syria Palaestina. The midrash forms an aggadic commentary on Genesis, in keeping with the midrashic exegesis of that age.  In a continuous sequence, broken only toward the end, the Biblical text is expounded, verse for verse, often word for word. Only genealogic passages and passages that furnish no material for exposition (as the reiterated account of Abraham's servant in ) are omitted.

Simplicity
Genesis Rabbah contains many simple explanations of words and sentences, often in the Aramaic language, suitable for the instruction of youth. It also contains varied aggadic expositions popular in the public lectures of the synagogues and schools. The editor of the midrash has strung together various longer or shorter explanations and aggadic interpretations of the successive passages, sometimes anonymously, sometimes citing the author. The editor adds to the running commentary longer aggadic disquisitions or narratives, connected in some way with the verse in question, or with one of the explanations of it — a method not unusual in the Talmud and in other midrashim.

The first chapters of Genesis, on the creation of the world and of man, furnished especially rich material for this mode of exegesis. Whole sections are devoted to comments on one or two verses of the text. Many references to contemporary philosophical thought are made with the purpose of refuting the opinions of nonbelievers. References to contemporaneous conditions and historical events also occur.  It is characteristic of the midrash to view the personages and conditions of the Bible in the light of the contemporary history of the time.

Though the stories embraced in Genesis furnished little occasion for comments on legal topics, Genesis Rabbah contains a few short legal (or halakic) sentences and quotations taken from the Mishnah and other sources.  This midrash is rich in sublime thoughts and finely worded sentences, in parables, and in foreign words, especially Greek.

Form
This extensive and important midrash, which forms a complete commentary on Genesis, and exemplifies all points of midrashic exegesis, is divided into sections.  Prefaces head these sections.  It is by these means distinguished from the tannaitic midrashim to the other books of the Torah, such as Mekilta, Sifra, and Sifre. Every chapter of the Genesis Rabbah is headed by the first verse of the passage to be explained, and is introduced, with few exceptions, by one or more prefatory remarks starting from a verse taken from another Biblical passage as text — generally from the Writings or Ketuvim. By various explanations of these texts, a transition is effected to the exposition of the particular verse of Genesis heading the section. There are in the Genesis Rabbah about 230 of these passages. About 70 are cited with the name of the Rabbi with whom they originated or whose explanation of the verse in question was used as an introduction to the section of Genesis Rabbah.

Introductory passages
Most of these passages are anonymous and may perhaps be ascribed in part to the author of Genesis Rabbah.  They begin with the verse of the text, which often stands at the head of the proem without any formula of introduction.  The structure of the prefatory passages varies. In some, only the introductory text is given, its application to the verse of Genesis to be expounded being self-evident or being left to a later working out. The single prefaces, of which there is a large number, contain explanations of their text which refer entirely or in its last part to the verse or passage of Genesis to be expounded in that section. The composite introductions consist of different expositions of the same Biblical verse, by different aggadists, strung together in various ways, but always arranged so that the last exposition — the last link of the introduction — leads to the exposition of the passage of Genesis, with the first verse of which the introductions often close.

For these introductions, which are often quite lengthy, the material for the several expositions was ready at hand. The original work on these passages consisted principally in the combining and grouping of the several sentences and expositions into a coordinate whole, arranged so that the last member forms the actual introduction to the exposition of the section. Definitely characterized as they are in their beginning by these introductions, the sections of Genesis Rabbah have no formal ending, although several show a transition to the Biblical passage that is expounded in the following section.

The principle of division
In the manuscripts, as well as in the editions, the sections are consecutively numbered. Many quotations in the Shulchan Aruch mention the passage of Genesis Rabbah by the number of the section. The total number of the sections, both in the manuscripts and in the editions, varies from 97 to 101. Nearly all the manuscripts and editions agree in counting 96 chapters.  The principle of division followed in the sections of Genesis Rabbah was evidently that of the Biblical text itself as fixed at the time of the compilation of this midrash, in accordance with the open and closed paragraphs (פתוחות and סתומות) in the Hebrew text of Genesis. There are separate sections in the midrash for almost all these sections as they are still found in Genesis, with the exception of the genealogical passages. But there are sections that bear evidences of relation to the Torah portions ("sedarim") of the Palestinian triennial cycle, and a careful investigation of these may lead to the discovery of an arrangement of sedarim different from that heretofore known from old registers. However, there are sections, especially in the beginning of the midrash, in which only one or a few verses at a time are expounded. The Torah portions of the customary one-year cycle are not regarded at all in the divisions of Genesis Rabba, neither are they marked in the best manuscripts or in the editio princeps of the midrash; the sections, therefore, can not be regarded as mere subdivisions of the sedarim, as which they appear in later editions of this midrash.

Material
Far more difficult than any question concerning the outward form of Genesis Rabbah is that of deciding how much of its present contents is original material included in it, and how much of later addition. The sections formed the framework that was to contain the exposition of a number of Biblical verses in continuous succession.

But with the notoriously loose construction of the aggadic exegesis it became easy to string together, on every verse or part of a verse, a number of rambling comments; or to add longer or shorter aggadic passages, stories, etc., connected in some way with the exposition of the text. This process of accretion took place quite spontaneously in Genesis Rabba, as in the other works of the Talmudic and midrashic literature.  Between the beginning and the completion of these works — if ever they were completed — a long period elapsed during which there was much addition and collection.

The tradition that Rabbi Hosha'iah is the author of Genesis Rabbah may be taken to mean that he began the work, in the form of the running commentary customary in tannaitic times, arranging the exposition on Genesis according to the sequence of the verses, and furnishing the necessary complement to the tannaitic midrashim on the other books of the Torah. The ascription of the Mekilta to Rabbi Ishmael and of the Jerusalem Talmud to Rabbi Johanan rests on a similar procedure. Perhaps the comments on Genesis were originally divided into sections that corresponded with the above-mentioned sections of the text, and that contained the beginnings of the simplest introductions, as the first traces of such introductions are found also in the tannaitic midrash. But the embellishment of the sections with numerous artistic introductions — which points to a combination of the form of the running commentary with the form of the finished homilies following the type of the Pesikta and Tanhuma Midrashim — was the result of the editing of Genesis Rabbah that is now extant, when the material found in collections and traditions of the aggadic exegesis of the period of the Amoraim was taken up in the midrash, and Genesis Rabbah was given its present form, if not its present bulk. Perhaps the editor made use also of different collections on the several parts of Genesis. The present Genesis Rabbah shows a singular disproportion between the length of the first Torah portion and that of the eleven others. The Torah portion Bereishit alone comprises 29 sections, being more than one-fourth of the whole work. It is possible that the present Genesis Rabbah is a combination of two midrashim of unequal proportions, and that the 29 sections of the first Torah portion — several of which expound only one or a few verses — constitute the extant or incomplete material of a Genesis Rabbah that was laid out on a much larger and more comprehensive scale than the midrash to the other Torah portions.

Origin of name
The work may have received its name, "Genesis Rabbah", from that larger midrash at the beginning of Genesis, unless that designation was originally used to distinguish this midrash from the shorter and older one, which was ascribed to Rabbi Hoshayah. The opinion that the name of the midrash finds its explanation in the first words, "Rabbi Hosha'yah rabbah began . . . " as if the word "rabbah" belonged originally to the name of the amora, and that the name of the work, "Genesis Rabba", is an abbreviation of "Bereshit derabbi Hoshayah rabbah", is untenable for the reason that in the best manuscripts — and in a very old quotation — the name "Rabbi Hoshayah" stands without the addition "rabbah" in the first preface at the beginning of the midrash. It would be singular if the authorial designation had been lost and yet the attribute had remained in the title of the midrash.

Date
It is difficult to ascertain the exact date of the editing of Genesis Rabbah. It was probably undertaken not much later than the Jerusalem Talmud (4th to 5th centuries).  But even then the text was probably not finally closed, for longer or shorter passages could always be added, the number of prefatory passages to a section be increased, and those existing be enlarged by accretion. Thus, beginning with the Torah portion Vayishlach, extensive passages are found that bear the marks of the later aggadah, and have points of connection with the Tanhuma homilies. The passages were probably added at an early date, since they are not entirely missing in the older manuscripts, which are free from many other additions and glosses that are found in the present editions. In the concluding chapters, Genesis Rabbah seems to have remained defective. In the sections of the Torah portion Vayigash, the comment is no longer carried out verse by verse; the last section of this Torah portion, as well as the first of the Torah portion Vayechi, is probably drawn from Tanhuma homilies.  The comment to the whole 48th chapter of Genesis is missing in all the manuscripts (with one exception), and to verses 1–14 in the editions.  The remaining portion of this Torah portion, the comment on Jacob's blessing is found in all the manuscripts — with the above-mentioned exceptions — in a revision showing later additions, a revision that was also used by the compiler of the Tanhuma Midrash edited by Solomon Buber.

The best manuscript of Genesis Rabbah is found in the Codex Add. 27,169 of the British Museum.  It was used for the critical edition issued by J. Theodor.

Print editions
Midrash Rabbah: Genesis. Translated by H. Freedman and Maurice Simon, Vols. 1–2. London: Soncino Press, 1983. .
Jacob Neusner. Confronting Creation: How Judaism Reads Genesis: An Anthology of Genesis Rabbah. Columbia, S.C.: University of South Carolina Press, 1991. .
 Artscroll Kleinman Edition Midrash Rabbah Genesis Vol 1–4, English/Hebrew with English elucidation http://www.artscroll.com/Books/mrbr2.html

References
  (entry by Marcus Jastrow and J. Theodor)

External links
Sacred Texts: Judaism: The Bereshith or Genesis Rabba, a selection of sayings from the work translated into English by Samuel Rapaport.
Rabbah Genesis Volume I  and Volume 2  at Internet Archive
Beresheit Rabbah in Aramaic

Genesis
Book of Genesis